A regicide is the purposeful killing of a monarch or sovereign of a polity, or the person who does such.

Regicide may also refer to:
"Regicide", a playing card game devised by Badgers From Mars
"Regicide", a song by Matmos from the 2003 album The Civil War
Warhammer 40,000: Regicide, a turn-based strategy chess-like video game developed by Hammerfall Publishing